Scott Stephens is an American television producer. He is an executive producer of True Detective and served as supervising producer on the western drama Deadwood, for which he was nominated for an Emmy Award.

References

External links 
 

American television producers
Living people
Year of birth missing (living people)